Napoleon Dynamite: The Game is a video game by American developer 7 Studios based on the film Napoleon Dynamite. The game was announced on May 9, 2007, and released October 30, 2007.

Gameplay
In the PlayStation Portable version of the Napoleon Dynamite game, there are 30 mini games, while the DS version has 25 mini games.

Reception

Napoleon Dynamite: The Game received generally unfavorable reviews. On review aggregator Metacritic, it received a 45/100 and a 37/100 for the DS and PSP versions, respectively. Review aggregator GameRankings gave the DS version a 53% and the PSP version a 40%.

An initial review from IGN gave the PSP version of the game a 4.5 out of 10, but gave the DS version a 7.0, praising how closely the look and feel of the game matched that of the film. GameSpot called the game "irrelevant" and "a poor effort", calling the gameplay not "even halfway amusing" and it a 4.0/10. 1Up.com stated that the game "totally disregards the humor of the film" and gave it a 3/10, while GamesRadar+ gave it a 1/5, stating that it "butchered" the source material and recommending readers stay "far, far away." PlayStation: The Official Magazine gave the PSP version a 3/10, calling the experience "totally unsatisfying".

See also 

 List of video games based on films
 List of PlayStation Portable games
 List of Nintendo DS games

References

Napoleon Dynamite
2007 video games
Crave Entertainment games
Nintendo DS games
PlayStation Portable games
Video games based on films
Video games developed in the United States
Multiplayer and single-player video games
7 Studios games